Rose Lodge is a census-designated place (CDP) and unincorporated community in Lincoln County, Oregon,  United States, along the 45th parallel. The population was 1,894 at the 2010 census.

Rose Lodge was named for a rose bower over the front gate of the post office established in 1908 by postmaster Julia Dodson.

Geography
Rose Lodge is in northern Lincoln County, with its northern border in part following the Tillamook County line. Oregon Route 18 runs through the community, leading west  to U.S. Route 101 and east  to McMinnville.

Demographics

As of the census of 2000, there were 1,708 people, 693 households, and 474 families residing in the CDP. The population density was 178.4 people per square mile (68.8/km2). There were 826 housing units at an average density of 86.3 per square mile (33.3/km2). The racial makeup of the CDP was 92.45% White, 0.18% African American, 2.81% Native American, 0.29% Asian, 1.35% from other races, and 2.93% from two or more races. Hispanic or Latino of any race were 3.16% of the population.

There were 693 households, out of which 23.5% had children under the age of 18 living with them, 57.6% were married couples living together, 7.6% had a female householder with no husband present, and 31.5% were non-families. 22.9% of all households were made up of individuals, and 11.1% had someone living alone who was 65 years of age or older. The average household size was 2.46 and the average family size was 2.85.

In the CDP, the population was spread out, with 21.0% under the age of 18, 7.9% from 18 to 24, 22.9% from 25 to 44, 29.6% from 45 to 64, and 18.6% who were 65 years of age or older. The median age was 44 years. For every 100 females, there were 97.9 males. For every 100 females age 18 and over, there were 92.9 males.

The median income for a household in the CDP was $39,214, and the median income for a family was $43,250. Males had a median income of $31,759 versus $19,957 for females. The per capita income for the CDP was $18,297. About 8.9% of families and 13.5% of the population were below the poverty line, including 15.2% of those under age 18 and 7.4% of those age 65 or over.

References

Unincorporated communities in Lincoln County, Oregon
Census-designated places in Oregon
1908 establishments in Oregon
Populated places established in 1908
Census-designated places in Lincoln County, Oregon
Unincorporated communities in Oregon